Sports Illustrated (SI) is an American sports magazine first published in August 1954. Founded by Stuart Scheftel, it was the first magazine with circulation over one million to win the National Magazine Award for General Excellence twice. It is also known for its annual swimsuit issue, which has been published since 1964, and has spawned other complementary media works and products.

Owned until 2018 by Time Inc., it was sold to Authentic Brands Group (ABG) following the sale of Time Inc. to Meredith Corporation. The Arena Group (formerly theMaven, Inc.) was subsequently awarded a 10-year license to operate the Sports Illustrated-branded editorial operations, while ABG licenses the brand for other non-editorial ventures and products.

History

Establishment
There were two magazines named Sports Illustrated before the current magazine was launched on August 9, 1954. In 1936, Stuart Scheftel created Sports Illustrated with a target market of sportsmen. He published the magazine from 1936 to 1942 on a monthly basis. The magazine focused on golf, tennis, and skiing with articles on the major sports. He then sold the name to Dell Publications, which released Sports Illustrated in 1949 and this version lasted six issues before closing. Dell's version focused on major sports (baseball, basketball, boxing) and competed on magazine racks against Sport and other monthly sports magazines. During the 1940s these magazines were monthly and they did not cover the current events because of the production schedules. There was no large-base, general, weekly sports magazine with a national following on actual active events. It was then that Time patriarch Henry Luce began considering whether his company should attempt to fill that gap. At the time, many believed sports was beneath the attention of serious journalism and did not think sports news could fill a weekly magazine, especially during the winter. A number of advisers to Luce, including Life magazine's Ernest Havemann, tried to kill the idea, but Luce, who was not a sports fan, decided the time was right.

The goal of the new magazine was to be basically a magazine, but with sports. Many at Time-Life scoffed at Luce's idea; in his Pulitzer Prize–winning biography, Luce and His Empire, W. A. Swanberg wrote that the company's intellectuals dubbed the proposed magazine "Muscle", "Jockstrap", and "Sweat Socks". Launched on August 9, 1954, it was not profitable (and would not be so for 12 years) and not particularly well run at first, but Luce's timing was good. The popularity of spectator sports in the United States was about to explode, and that popularity came to be driven largely by three things: economic prosperity, television, and Sports Illustrated.

The early issues of the magazine seemed caught between two opposing views of its audience. Much of the subject matter was directed at upper-class activities such as yachting, polo and safaris, but upscale would-be advertisers were unconvinced that sports fans were a significant part of their market.

Expansion of sports coverage
After more than a decade of steady losses, the magazine's fortunes finally turned around in the 1960s when Andre Laguerre became its managing editor. A European correspondent for Time, Inc., who later became chief of the Time-Life news bureaux in Paris and London (for a time he ran both simultaneously), Laguerre attracted Henry Luce's attention in 1956 with his singular coverage of the Winter Olympic Games in Cortina d'Ampezzo, Italy, which became the core of SIs coverage of those games. In May 1956, Luce brought Laguerre to New York to become the assistant managing editor of the magazine. He was named managing editor in 1960, and he more than doubled the circulation by instituting a system of departmental editors, redesigning the internal format, and inaugurating the unprecedented use in a news magazine of full-color photographic coverage of the week's sports events. He was also one of the first to sense the rise of national interest in professional football.

Laguerre also instituted the innovative concept of one long story at the end of every issue, which he called the "bonus piece". These well-written, in-depth articles helped to distinguish Sports Illustrated from other sports publications, and helped launch the careers of such legendary writers as Frank Deford, who in March 2010 wrote of Laguerre, "He smoked cigars and drank Scotch and made the sun move across the heavens ... His genius as an editor was that he made you want to please him, but he wanted you to do that by writing in your own distinct way."

Laguerre is also credited with the conception and creation of the annual Swimsuit Issue, which quickly became, and remains, the most popular issue each year.

In 1986, co-owned property HBO/Cannon Video had inked a pact to produce video versions of the magazine for $20 on the sell-through market, running just 30–45 minutes on the tape.

In 1990, Time Inc. merged with Warner Communications to form the media conglomerate Time Warner. In 2014, Time Inc. was spun off from Time Warner.

 Sale to Authentic Brands Group, Maven 
In 2018, the magazine was sold to Meredith Corporation by means of its acquisition of parent company Time Inc., however Meredith planned to sell Sports Illustrated due to not aligning with its lifestyle properties. Authentic Brands Group announced its intent to acquire Sports Illustrated for $110 million the next year, stating that it would leverage its brand and other assets for new opportunities that "stay close to the DNA and the heritage of the brand." Upon the announcement, Meredith would enter into a licensing agreement to continue as publisher of the Sports Illustrated editorial operations for at least the next two years. In June 2019, the rights to publish the Sports Illustrated editorial operations were licensed to the digital media company theMaven, Inc. under a 10-year contract, with Ross Levinsohn as CEO. The company had backed a bid by Junior Bridgeman to acquire SI. In preparation for the closure of the sale to ABG and Maven, The Wall Street Journal reported that there would be Sports Illustrated employee layoffs, which was confirmed after the acquisition had closed.

In October 2019, editor-in-chief Chris Stone stepped down. Later that month, Sports Illustrated announced its hiring of veteran college sports writer Pat Forde. In January 2020, it announced an editorial partnership with The Hockey News, focusing on syndication of NHL-related coverage. In 2021, it announced a similar partnership with Morning Read for golf coverage, with its website being merged into that of Sports Illustrated. It also partnered with iHeartMedia to distribute and co-produce podcasts.

In September 2021, Maven, now known as The Arena Group, acquired the New Jersey-based sports news website The Spun,  which would integrate into Sports Illustrated. In 2022, ABG announced several non-editorial ventures involving the Sports Illustrated brand, including an apparel line for JCPenney "inspired by iconic moments in sports" (it was not the brand's first foray into clothing, as it launched a branded swimsuit line in conjunction with its Swimsuit Issue in 2018), and resort hotels in Orlando and Punta Cana.

Innovations

From its start, Sports Illustrated introduced a number of innovations that are generally taken for granted today:

Liberal use of color photos—though the six-week lead time initially meant they were unable to depict timely subject matter
Scouting reports—including a World Series Preview and New Year's Day bowl game round-up that enhanced the viewing of games on television
In-depth sports reporting from writers like Robert Creamer, Tex Maule and Dan Jenkins.
Regular illustration features by artists like Robert Riger.
High school football Player of the Month awards.
Inserts of sports cards in the center of the magazine (1954 & 1955)
1994 Launched Sports Illustrated Interactive CD-ROM with StarPress Multimedia, Incorporates player stats, video and highlights from the year in sports.
In 2015 Sports Illustrated purchased a group of software companies and combined them to create Sports Illustrated Play, a platform that offers sports league management software as a service.

Color printing

In 1965, offset printing began. This allowed the color pages of the magazine to be printed overnight, not only producing crisper and brighter images, but also finally enabling the editors to merge the best color with the latest news. By 1967, the magazine was printing 200 pages of "fast color" a year; in 1983, SI became the first American full-color newsweekly. An intense rivalry developed between photographers, particularly Walter Iooss and Neil Leifer, to get a decisive cover shot that would be on newsstands and in mailboxes only a few days later.

In the late 1970s and early 1980s, during Gil Rogin's term as Managing Editor, the feature stories of Frank Deford became the magazine's anchor. "Bonus pieces" on Pete Rozelle, Woody Hayes, Bear Bryant, Howard Cosell and others became some of the most quoted sources about these figures, and Deford established a reputation as one of the best writers of the time.

Regular segments

 Who's Hot, Who's Not: A feature on who's on a tear and who's in a slump.
 Inside the NFL, MLB, NHL, NBA, College Football, College Basketball, NASCAR, Golf, Boxing, Horse Racing, Soccer and Tennis (sports vary from issue to issue) has the writers from each sport to address the latest news and rumors in their respective fields.
 Faces in the Crowd: honors talented amateur athletes and their accomplishments.The Point After: A back-page column featuring a rotation of SI writers as well as other contributors. Content varies from stories to opinion, focusing on both the world of sports and the role sports play in society.

Awards
American Sportswear Designer Award (ASDA Awards)
In 1956, Sports Illustrated began presenting annual awards to fashion or clothing designers who had excelled in the field of sportswear/activewear. The first ASDAs of 1956, presented to Claire McCardell with a separate Designer of the Year award to Rudi Gernreich, were chosen following a vote of 200 American top retailers. The following year, the voting pool had increased to 400 fashion industry experts, including Dorothy Shaver and Stanley Marcus, when Sydney Wragge and Bill Atkinson received the awards. The Italian designer Emilio Pucci was the first non-American to receive the award in 1961. The awards were presented up until at least 1963, when Marc Bohan received the prize. Other winners include Jeanne S. Campbell, Bonnie Cashin and Rose Marie Reid who formed the first all-women winning group in 1958.

Performer of the Year
Maya Moore of the WNBA's Minnesota Lynx was the inaugural winner of the Sports Illustrated Performer of the Year Award in 2017.

Sportsperson of the Year

Since 1954, Sports Illustrated magazine has annually presented the Sportsperson of the Year award to "the athlete or team whose performance that year most embodies the spirit of sportsmanship and achievement." Roger Bannister won the first-ever Sportsman of the Year award thanks to his record-breaking time of 3:59.4 for a mile (the first-ever time a mile had been run under four minutes). Both men and women have won the award, originally called "Sportsman of the Year" and renamed "Sportswoman of the Year" or "Sportswomen of the Year" when applicable; it is currently known as "Sportsperson of the Year."

The 2017 winners of the award are Houston Texans defensive end, J. J. Watt, and Houston Astros second baseman, José Altuve. Both athletes were recognized for their efforts in helping rebuild the city of Houston following Hurricane Harvey in addition to Altuve being a part of the Astros team that won the franchise's first World Series in 2017.

The 2018 winners were the Golden State Warriors as a team for winning their third NBA Title in four years.

The 2021  winner was Tom Brady for his Super Bowl 55 win.

Sportsman of the Century

In 1999, Sports Illustrated named Muhammad Ali the Sportsman of the Century at the Sports Illustrateds 20th Century Sports Awards in New York City's Madison Square Garden.

===Sports Illustrateds Muhammad Ali Legacy Award===
In 2015, the magazine renamed its Sportsman Legacy Award to the Sports Illustrateds Muhammad Ali Legacy Award. The annual award was originally created in 2008 and honors former "sports figures who embody the ideals of sportsmanship, leadership and philanthropy as vehicles for changing the world." Ali first appeared on the magazine's cover in 1963 and went on to be featured on numerous covers during his storied career. His widow, Lonnie Ali, is consulted when choosing a recipient. In 2017, football quarterback Colin Kaepernick was honored with the Award, which was presented by Beyoncé. In 2018, WWE professional wrestler John Cena was honored with the award.

All-decade awards and honors

Top 20 Female Athletes of the Decade (2009)
Top 20 Male Athletes of the Decade (2009)
All-Decade Team (2009) (MLB, NBA, NFL, NHL, college basketball, college football)
Top 10 Coaches/Managers of the Decade (2009)
Top 10 GMs/Executives of the Decade (2009)
Top Team of the Decade (2009) (MLB, NBA, NFL, NHL, college basketball, college football)
Top 25 Franchises of the Decade (2009)
Major League Baseball honors
National Basketball Association honors
National Football League honors
National Hockey League honors
College basketball honors
College football honors

Top sports colleges
For a 2002 list of the top 200 Division I sports colleges in the U.S., see footnote.

 Wrestling 
 Male/Men's Wrestler of the Year 

 Women's Wrestler of the Year 

 Wrestler of the Year 

Cover history
The following list contains the athletes with most covers.

The magazine's cover is the basis of a sports myth known as the Sports Illustrated Cover Jinx.Most covers by athlete, 1954–2016Most covers by team, 1954 – May 2008Most covers by sport, 1954–2009Celebrities on the cover, 1954–2010Fathers and sons who have been featured on the coverPresidents who have been featured on the coverTribute covers (In Memoriam)Writers

Photographers

Robert Beck
Bob Rosato
John Biever
David Bergman
Simon Bruty
James Drake
Bill Eppridge
Graham FinlaysonSearch results for Finlayson, Sports Illustrated archive. Accessed February 17, 2013.
Bill Frakes
John Iacono
Walter Iooss
Lynn Johnsom
Heinz Kleutmeier
David E. Klutho
Neil Leifer
Phillip Leonian
Bob Martin
John W. McDonough
Manny Millan
Peter Read Miller
Craig Molenhouse
Hy Peskin
Chuck Solomn
Damian Strohmeyer
Al Tielemans

Spinoffs
Sports Illustrated has helped launched a number of related publishing ventures, including:

 Sports Illustrated Kids magazine (circulation 950,000)
 Launched in January 1989
 Won the "Distinguished Achievement for Excellence in Educational Publishing" award 11 times
 Won the "Parents' Choice Magazine Award" 7 times
 Sports Illustrated Almanac annuals
 Introduced in 1991
 Yearly compilation of sports news and statistics in book form
 SI.com sports news web siteSports Illustrated Australia Launched in 1992 and lasted 6 issues **Sports Illustrated Canada Was created and published in Canada with US content from 1993 to 1995.  Most of the issues appear to have the same cover except they say 'Canadian Edition'.  These issues are numbered differently in the listing.  A group of the Canadian issues have unique Canadian athletes (hockey mostly) and all the Canadian issues may have some different article content.  The advertising may also be Canada-centric.Sports Illustrated Presents Launched in 1989
 This is their tribute and special edition issues that are sold both nationally or regionally as stand alone products.  **Originally started with Super Bowl Tributes the product became a mainstay in 1993 with Alabama as the NCAA National Football Champions. Today multiple issues are released including regional releases of the NCAA, NBA, NFL, MLB champions along with special events or special people.  Advertising deals are also done with Sports Illustrated Presents (Kelloggs).
 CNNSI.com a 24-hour sports news web site
 Launched on July 17, 1997
 Online version of the magazine
 The domain name was sold in May 2015
 Sports Illustrated Women magazine (highest circulation 400,000)
 Launched in March 2000
 Ceased publication in December 2002 because of a weak advertising climate
 Sports Illustrated on Campus magazine
 Launched on September 4, 2003
 Dedicated to college athletics and the sports interests of college students.
 Distributed free on 72 college campuses through a network of college newspapers.
 Circulation of one million readers between the ages of 18 and 24.
 Ceased publication in December 2005 because of a weak advertising climateSports Illustrated Online CasinoLaunched on February 7, 2023, in Michigan
Operated in co-operation with 888 Holdings
Also includes Sports Illustrated Sportsbook which launched in September 2021Esports Illustrated'''Launched in March 2023 in partnership with Gaud-Hammer Gaming Group.

See alsoSports Illustrated KidsSports Illustrated Swimsuit IssueList of Sports Illustrated Swimsuit Issue cover models
University of South Carolina steroid scandal

 References 
 Citations 

 Sources 

 .
 .
 .

Further reading

External links

SI Vault (complete archive of Sports Illustrated'' issues including Swimsuit)
Archived Sports Illustrated Magazines (1954-2016) on the Internet Archive

 
Sports magazines published in the United States
Weekly magazines published in the United States
Magazines established in 1954
Magazines published in New York (state)
2019 mergers and acquisitions
Magazines formerly owned by Meredith Corporation
Authentic Brands Group